Simon Husbands (born July 16, 1969, in Bridgetown, Barbados) is a jockey in Thoroughbred horse racing.

Husbands began racing in his native Barbados in the mid nineteen eighties then a few years later relocated to Fort Erie Racetrack in Fort Erie, Ontario, Canada where he earned his first North American win in 1990. Riding from a base at Woodbine Racetrack in Toronto since 2000, among his victories, Simon Husbands has won the Shady Well, Frost King and Victoria Park Stakes. In 1998 he traveled to his homeland where he won the country's most prestigious race, the Barbados Gold Cup.

Simon Husbands is the older brother of jockey Patrick Husbands who followed in his footsteps and settled in Canada.

References
 Profile of Simon Husbands at Woodbine Entertainment Group (PDF)

1969 births
Living people
Barbadian emigrants to Canada
Barbadian jockeys
Canadian jockeys
Sportspeople from Bridgetown